Juan Montón y Mallén (c. 1730 – December 1781, in Segovia) was a Spanish composer and maestro de capilla of Segovia Cathedral. He was succeeded by Pedro Aranaz y Vides.

Works, editions and recordings
Editions
 Mass a 6. Arias and tonos with two violins.
 Mass a 8 
Recordings
 Montón y Mallén Alienta, mortal, alienta Alicia Lázaro, NB

References

1730s births
1781 deaths
Spanish male classical composers
Spanish Classical-period composers
18th-century classical composers
18th-century male musicians